Laurent Sagart (born 1951) is a senior researcher at the Centre de recherches linguistiques sur l'Asie orientale (CRLAO – UMR 8563) unit of the Centre National de la Recherche Scientifique (CNRS).

Biography
Born in Paris in 1951, he earned his Ph.D. in 1977 at the University of Paris 7 and his doctorat d'État in 1990 at University of Aix-Marseille 1. His early work focused on Chinese dialectology. He then turned his attention to Old Chinese, attempting a reconstruction of Old Chinese that separated word roots and affixes. His recent work, in collaboration with William H. Baxter, is a reconstruction of Old Chinese that builds on earlier scholarship and in addition takes into account paleography, phonological distinctions in conservative Chinese dialects (Min, Waxiang) as well as the early layers of Chinese loanwords to Vietnamese, Hmong-Mien and to a lesser extent, Tai-Kadai. A reconstruction of 4,000 Chinese characters has been published online. Their 2014 book has been awarded the Bloomfield prize of the Linguistic Society of America.

Sino-Austronesian

Sagart is known for his proposal of the Sino-Austronesian language family. He considers the Austronesian languages to be related to the Sino-Tibetan languages, and also treats the Tai–Kadai languages as a sister group to the Malayo-Polynesian languages within the Austronesian language family.

Indo-European
Laurent Sagart also contributed to Indo-European studies. He co-authored a proposal that the ability to digest milk played an important role in the Indo-European expansion (Garnier et al. 2017), and took part in a controversy in French academia concerning Indo-European studies (Pellard et al. 2018).

Origin of Sino-Tibetan language family
Along with numerous researchers such as Valentin Thouzeau, Robin J. Ryder, Simon J. Greenhill, Johann-Mattis List, Guillaume Jacques and Yunfan Lai, Sagart conclude in a study published in the Proceedings of the National Academy of Sciences of the United States of America that the Sino-Tibetan languages originated among millet farmers, located in Northern China, around 7,200 years ago.

Selected works
 
 
 
  
 
 
 Shā Jiā’ěr 沙加尔 [Laurent Sagart] and Bái Yīpíng 白一平 [William H. Baxter]. 2010. Shànggǔ Hànyǔ de N- hé m- qiánzhuì 上古汉语的 N- 和 m- 前缀. Hàn-Zàng yǔ xuébào 汉藏语学报 [Journal of Sino-Tibetan Linguistics] 4. 62–69.

References

External links
 CNRS homepage
 Hyper Article en Ligne (HAL)
 Laurent Sagart's Academia page
 Laurent Sagart's blog

French sinologists
Linguists of Southeast Asian languages
University of Paris alumni
Academic staff of the University of Provence
Paleolinguists
Linguists of Sino-Austronesian languages
Linguists of Formosan languages
1951 births
Living people
University of Provence alumni
Linguists of Kra–Dai languages
Linguists of Sino-Tibetan languages
Linguists of Chinese
French National Centre for Scientific Research scientists
Historical linguists